Hasanabad-e Sanjarlu (also Romanized as Ḩasanābād-e Sanjarlū; also known as Ḩasanābād, Ḩasanābād-e Khafrak, and Hasan Abad Khafrak) is a village in Rahmat Rural District, Seyyedan District, Marvdasht County, Fars Province, Iran. At the 2006 census, its population was 1,377, in 323 families.

References 

Populated places in Marvdasht County